Borglum can refer to:

 Børglum, Danish village in Northern Jutland, formerly the location of a Catholic bishopric 
 Børglum Abbey
 Ancient See of Børglum
 Gutzon Borglum (1867 – 1941), American sculptor, famous for creating the monumental presidents' heads at Mount Rushmore
 Lene Børglum (born 1961), Danish film producer
 Lincoln Borglum (1912 – 1986), American sculptor, son of Gutzon and first superintendent of Mount Rushmore National Memorial
 Solon Borglum (1868 – 1922), American sculptor most noted for his depiction of frontier life, brother of Gutzon and uncle of Lincoln
 Scyller Borglum, American politician
 The Bishop of Börglum and his Men (Bispen på Børglum og hans frænde), a short story, see Hans Christian Andersen bibliography